Louis Besson (born 6 May 1937 in Barby, Savoie, France) is a French politician and member of the French Socialist Party. He served several terms in the National Assembly, and was the Minister for Housing and Transportation from 11 December 1990 to 15 May 1991. He is particularly known for his support for the protection of agriculture in natural mountain areas.

References

1937 births
Living people
Socialist Party (France) politicians
Politicians from Chambéry
Government ministers of France
Commandeurs of the Légion d'honneur
Mayors of places in Auvergne-Rhône-Alpes
Members of Parliament for Savoie